POPPY is the code name given to a series of U.S. intelligence satellites operated by the National Reconnaissance Office.  The POPPY satellites recorded electronic signals intelligence (ELINT) data, targeting radar installations in the Soviet Union and Soviet naval ships at sea.

The POPPY program was a continuation within NRO's Program C of the Naval Research Laboratory's Galactic Radiation and Background (GRAB) ELINT program, also known as Tattletale.  The National Security Agency was given the responsibility of collecting, interpreting, and reporting the signals intercepted.

The existence of the POPPY program was declassified by the NRO in September 2005, although most of the details about its capabilities and operation are still classified. The NRO revealed, though, that the POPPY satellites, like other US signals intelligence (SIGINT) systems, used the principle of signals time difference of arrival, which enables precise locating of an object.
All POPPY launches orbited multiple satellites. The first POPPY launch included two satellites, launch #2 and #3 three satellites each, and subsequent launches orbited four satellites each.
The full configuration  thus employed four vehicles in low Earth orbit.

There were seven launches of POPPY satellites from Vandenberg Air Force Base from 1962 until 1971, all of which were successful.  The program continued until August 1977.

Satellite blocks
The size and capabilities (in particular radio frequency coverage) of the POPPY satellites evolved over the course of the 19-year program. Two Block I satellites were launched with the first and third POPPY launch, and one with the second POPPY launch. Two Block II satellites were launched on the second POPPY launch, one each on the third and fifth POPPY launch, and four on the fourth POPPY launch. Three Block III satellites were launched on the fifth POPPY launch, and four each on the sixth and seventh POPPY launches.

Ammonia microthrusters were used for station keeping in order to maintain the orbital configuration of the POPPY constellation. Satellites used 2- or 3-axis gravity gradient stabilization.

Launches

See also

 Naval Ocean Surveillance System

References

 MacDonald, Robert A. and Moreno, Sharon K.  Raising the Periscope... Grab and Poppy, America's early ELINT Satellites. Pub. by NRO, 2005.
 NRO Historian, History of the Poppy satellite system (scribd.com)
 Jonathan's space report No. 554  (2005-09-24) notes on POPPY payloads

External links

Poppy program press release
Poppy program Fact sheet
Gunter's Space Page - information on Poppy 20in version, 24in version, multifaceted version
Space.com news article

1962 in spaceflight
1963 in spaceflight
1971 in spaceflight
National Reconnaissance Office satellites
Military equipment introduced in the 1960s